South Broadway Historic District may refer to the following places:
South Broadway Historic District (New Ulm, Minnesota), listed on the National Register of Historic Places
South Broadway Historic District (De Pere, Wisconsin), listed on the National Register of Historic Places